The 2011 All-Ireland Intermediate Hurling Championship was the 28th staging of the All-Ireland hurling championship since its establishment by the Gaelic Athletic Association in 1961. The championship began on 29 May 2011 and ended on 27 August 2011.

Kilkenny were the defending champions, however, they were defeated by Clare who won the title following a 2-13 to 1-11 victory in the final.

Team summaries

Results

Leinster Intermediate Hurling Championship

Munster Intermediate Hurling Championship

All-Ireland Intermediate Hurling Championship

Statistics

Top scorers

Overall

Single game

References

Intermediate
All-Ireland Intermediate Hurling Championship